Mordechai ben Abraham Finzi (1407–1476 in Mantua) was a Jewish mathematician, astronomer, grammarian and physician in Mantua.

Work
Finzi's astronomical tables were published under the title Luḥot, probably before 1480. He wrote glosses to Efodi's Hebrew grammar, Ḥesheb ha-Efod.

He also translated a number of mathematical books into Hebrew, such as a work of geometry under the title Ḥokmat ha-Medidah, and the Book of Algebra of Abu Kamil under the title Taḥbulat ha-Mispar.

References

15th-century Italian mathematicians
15th-century Italian physicians
15th-century Italian writers
15th-century Italian Jews
15th-century Italian astronomers
Medieval Jewish astronomers
Medieval Jewish physicians
Scientists from Mantua
Year of birth uncertain
1476 deaths
Jewish grammarians
Translators to Hebrew